Pat Courtney (born 1940 in Dublin) is an Irish former footballer who played as a full back, mainly on the left.

He joined Shamrock Rovers in 1958 and made his debut in a League of Ireland Shield game on 27 September 1959.

He played in 17 European games including appearances in the European Champion Clubs' Cup, Inter-Cities Fairs Cup and the UEFA Cup Winners' Cup. He played in 16 consecutive European games from 1962 until injury made him miss the win over FC Schalke 04 in 1969. He played against Valencia CF, SK Rapid Wien, Real Zaragoza and FC Bayern Munich amongst others.

He represented the League of Ireland 4 times between 1962 and 1967 and was also an amateur cap.

Courtney shared a testimonial with John Keogh (footballer) in May 1967.

He left Glenmalure Park at the end of the 1970/71 season.

Honours
League of Ireland: 1
  Shamrock Rovers - 1963/64
FAI Cup: 7
  Shamrock Rovers - 1962, 1964, 1965, 1966, 1967, 1968, 1969
League of Ireland Shield: 5
  Shamrock Rovers - 1962/63, 1963/64, 1964/65, 1965/66, 1967/68
Leinster Senior Cup: 2
  Shamrock Rovers - 1964, 1969
Dublin City Cup: 2
  Shamrock Rovers - 1963/64, 1966/67
Top Four Cup:
  Shamrock Rovers - 1965/66
Blaxnit Cup
  Shamrock Rovers 1967-68

See also
One-club man.

Sources
 The Hoops by Paul Doolan and Robert Goggins

References

Republic of Ireland association footballers
Shamrock Rovers F.C. players
League of Ireland players
United Soccer Association players
Boston Rovers players
1941 births
Living people
League of Ireland XI players
Association football defenders